Ambajipet mandal is one of the 22 mandals in Konaseema district of the Indian state of Andhra Pradesh.

Villages 

Ambajipet mandal consists of 14 villages. The following are the list of villages in the mandal:

References

Mandals in Konaseema district
Mandals in Andhra Pradesh